The Dr. Carroll D. and Lorena R. North Evans House is a historic house in Columbus, Nebraska. It was built by Walter L. Roth in 1908 for Carroll D. Evans, a surgeon, and his wife, née Lorena Rose North. It was designed by architect Charles H. Wurdeman in the Renaissance Revival, Greek Revival, Colonial Revival and Spanish Colonial Revival styles. It has been listed on the National Register of Historic Places since March 14, 1991.

References

		
National Register of Historic Places in Platte County, Nebraska
Houses completed in 1908
1908 establishments in Nebraska